The 2001 Toyota Grand Prix of Long Beach was a Championship Auto Racing Teams (CART) motor race held on April 8, 2001 on the streets of Long Beach, California, USA. It was the 2nd round of the 2001 CART FedEx Championship Series season. Team Penske driver Hélio Castroneves led all 82 laps from pole position ahead of Monterrey winner Cristiano da Matta and Penske teammate Gil de Ferran to win his fourth career race.

While Castroneves dominated the race from the front, his lead was threatened with each of the four caution periods throughout the race, which grouped the field together behind the pace car and erased the gap between each driver. Nevertheless, Castroneves was able to pull away each time with little threat to his position. After starting in 2nd place, Kenny Bräck was forced to retire early due to a gearbox issue.

Castroneves jumped five places in the points standings to 3rd overall, while podium finishers da Matta and de Ferran remained 1st and 2nd, respectively. Meanwhile, Honda eked ahead of Toyota in the manufacturer's standings by one point. This would be the last CART race for Dale Coyne Racing's two drivers, Luiz Garcia Jr. and Michael Krumm; after competing full-time since 1984, the team withdrew from the series after the race and did not return until 2003.

Qualifying

Race

– Includes two bonus points for leading the most laps and being the fastest qualifier.

Race statistics
Lead changes: 0 among 0 drivers

Standings after the race

Drivers' standings 

Constructors' standings

Manufacturer's Standings

References

Long Beach Grand Prix